Four Letter Worlds is a comics anthology published by American company Image Comics in  2005; it tells 16 stories revolving around four lettered words: Love, Hate, Fear, and Fate.

Organized by Image Comics' Executive Director Eric Stephenson,  contributors to the book include Amber Benson, R'John Bernales, Joe Casey, Chynna Clugston, Kieron Dwyer, Jay Faerber, Matt Fraction, Steven Griffin, Mike Hawthorne, Phil Hester, Mike Huddleston, Antony Johnston, Robert Kirkman, Steve Lieber, Jim Mahfood, Jamie McKelvie, B. Clay Moore, Scott Morse, Mike Norton, Jeff Parker, Jamie S. Rich, Mark Ricketts, Matt Roberts, Steve Rolston, Eric Stephenson, J. Torres & Andi Watson.

References
Four Letter Worlds @ comicbookdb

Image Comics graphic novels
Comics anthologies